Pramila Rani Brahma is a Bodo Politician from the state of Assam. She was a member of the Assam Legislative Assembly from Bodoland People's Front. She became minister in Sarbananda Sonowal led government in 2016. She was also minister in Tarun Gogoi government until 2014. She has been elected for the sixth straight time from the Kokrajhar East constituency.

References 

Living people
Bodoland People's Front politicians
State cabinet ministers of Assam
Assam MLAs 1991–1996
Assam MLAs 1996–2001
Assam MLAs 2001–2006
Assam MLAs 2006–2011
Assam MLAs 2011–2016
Assam MLAs 2016–2021
21st-century Indian women politicians
21st-century Indian politicians
People from Kokrajhar
Women members of the Assam Legislative Assembly
Women state cabinet ministers of India
Bodo people
1951 births
20th-century Indian women
20th-century Indian people